Napoleon Dzombe is a businessman and philanthropist in Malawi. He is the founder of Blessing Hospital.

Life
He was a major figure in giving aid during the 2001-2002 drought in Malawi. Dzombe also works to promote a better agricultural practices in Malawi. He owns and operates Madalitso Food Production and also owns a sugar corporation. Dzombe's company Mtalimanja Holdings Limited has also invested millions of dollars in large scale Rice milling machinery.

In 2012, Dzombe lead a group of businessmen who made a major investment in biodiesel technology for Malawi.

His work was the subject of the 2005 short film "A Warm Heart".

Dzombe is a member of the Church of Christ.

References

Sources
Nu Skin article on Dzombe
BYU TIV article on Dzombe
Nu Skin article on Dzombe
Feb. 8, 2013 Malawi News Agency article on Dzombe donating food to a hospital
Article on agricultural village founded by Dzombe

Date of birth missing (living people)
Living people
Malawian businesspeople
Malawian Christians
Year of birth missing (living people)
Members of the Churches of Christ